Coombe is a village in mid Cornwall, England, United Kingdom.

The village is situated approximately four miles (6 km) west of St Austell at 
. It is in the civil parish of St Stephen-in-Brannel.

References

Villages in Cornwall